Khatia Tchkonia, (born 16 October 1989) is a Georgian women's football midfielder, who lately played in the Turkish Women's First Football League for Konak Belediyespor with jersey number 29. She is a member of the Georgia women's national football team since 2010.

Club career 

Khatia Tchkonia played in her hometown club FC Dinamo Tbilisi. She made her first international appearance at the 2007–08 UEFA Women's Cup Group A7 matches. She netted two goals against the Serbian team ŽFK Napredak Kruševac.

She joined the Turkish club Trabzonspor July 16, 2009 right before the qualification matches of the 2009–10 UEFA Women's Champions League. She scored a goal in her first match in the tournament against the Slovene team ŽNK Krka. She participated also in the two following matches. After playing one season and scoring nine goals in 17 league matches, she transferred the rival team Trabzon İdmanocağı in the same city. She played three seasons capping 51 times and netting 34 goals. For the 2012–13 season, she moved to another Black Sea club, Kdz. Ereğlispor, where she continues to play. She transferred to the Istanbul-based club Ataşehr Belediyespor in the second half of the 2016–17 season.

On January 4, 2018, Tchkonia transferred to İlkadım Belediyesi Yabancılar Pazarı Spor.

After relegation of her club to the Second League, she left her club, and transferred to the İzmir-based club Konak Belediyespor in the 2018–19 First League season.

On 2 July 2019, Tchkonia left her club Konak Belediyespor, and returnedto her country. In January 2023, she moved again to Turkey, and joined Hatayspor to play in the second half of the 2022–23 Super League.

International career 
Tchkonia debuted in the Georgia women's national team playing at the 2011 FIFA Women's World Cup qualification – UEFA Group 3 match against Greece on April 15, 2010, and appeared also in the match against the Bulgarian women. She participated at the UEFA Women's Euro 2013 qualifying matches against Malta, Armenia and Faroe Islands. She was called up to play at the 2015 FIFA Women's World Cup qualification (UEFA) – Group 2 matches. She played in the group against Lithuania, Montenegro and Faroe Islands, and scored one goal.

Career statistics 
.

International goals

Honours 
 Turkish Women's First Football League
 Trabzonspor
 Winners (1): 2009–10

 Kdz. ereğlispor
 Third places (1): 2012–13

 Ataşehir Belediyespor
 Third places (1): 2016–17

 Konak Belediyespor
 Third places (1): 2018–19

References 

Living people
1989 births
Footballers from Tbilisi
Women's footballers from Georgia (country)
Women's association football midfielders
Expatriate women's footballers from Georgia (country)
Expatriate sportspeople from Georgia (country) in Turkey
Georgia (country) women's international footballers
Expatriate women's footballers in Turkey
Trabzonspor women's players
Trabzon İdmanocağı women's players
Karadeniz Ereğlispor players
Ataşehir Belediyespor players
İlkadım Belediyespor players
Konak Belediyespor players
Turkish Women's Football Super League players
Hatayspor (women's football) players